Radio tekee muron is a Finnish cookbook written by various employees of the Finnish Yleisradio broadcasting company. The name, meaning "The radio makes a grain of cereal", is a parody of "Radio tekee murron", a 1951 Finnish film directed by Matti Kassila, meaning "The radio commits a burglary".

External links
 Radio tekee muron at the Yleisradio shop

Finnish cookbooks
Finnish literature